Veliidae is a family of gregarious predatory insects in the suborder Heteroptera. They are commonly known as riffle bugs, small water striders, or broad-shouldered water striders because the segment immediately behind the head is wider than the rest of the abdomen. The genus Rhagovelia is also referred to as a ripple bug.

Veliidae have a specialized body plan that allows them to walk on water and are neuston. Gerridae is another closely related group that is also neuston and both are in the superfamily Gerroidea. They can be found on ponds, near lake shores, and in rivers worldwide. Some species can also be found on plants near water, in salt water or in mud flats.

Life cycle
Like all Heteroptera, the Veliidae go through an egg, nymph and adult stage. They have four or five nymphal instars. Both the adults and nymphs live together gregariously, in loose communities and can often be found in large groups. Eggs are usually laid underwater, attached to the stream bed, rocks or plant material and held together by a gelatinous substance. In most species females lay under 30 eggs. Nymphs are very similar to adults, but have one segmented tarsus on mid and hind leg as opposed to the adults' two. Some species prefer rapids or riffles in streams but many prefer calmer water.

Distribution
Veliidae is the largest gerromorphan family and has almost 1173 species and 66 genera. The present distribution of these species points to two centers of origin: one in the Indo-Malayan region and another on the shores of the Caribbean Sea. The geographical distance between these points is probably due to continental drift. And now they are present across all continents (except Antarctica).

Description
Veliidae are very similar to Gerridae. The most consistent characteristic used to separate these two families are internal genitalia differences, however external cues are usually sufficient to tell the families apart.

A general description is as follows: an oval to elongate body covered with hydrofuge hairs. Wings can be present or absent; when present the wings range from well devolved to vestigial. The four segmented antennae is longer than the head and readily visible. The antennae is non-aristate. The eyes are usually large, but there are no ocelli.

Males and females can be differentiated by the fore tibiae. Males have smaller tibiae with a grasping comb, as opposed to the larger plain female tibiae.

Water walking
Veliidae can walk on water because they take advantage of the high surface tension of water and have hydrophobic legs that distribute their weight across more water.

Although Gerridae typically have longer legs, Veliidae also have legs that spread out the weight over a relatively large area. Thousands of hydrofugal hairs also coat the entire body, mitigating potential problems incurred by water contact: air bubbles, trapped among the tiny hairs if the insect is submerged, lift the insect towards the surface again.

References

 Tree of Life
 Fauna Europaea
 Marine Insects

External links

 Image

 
Gerroidea
Heteroptera families
Taxa named by Jean Guillaume Audinet-Serville
Taxa named by Charles Jean-Baptiste Amyot